Austin Dufault (born January 3, 1990) is an American former professional basketball player for Niigata Albirex BB of the B.League.

College Statistics 

|-
| style="text-align:left;"|2008–09
| style="text-align:left;"|Colorado
| 31 || 31 || 30.7 || .425 || .245 || .671 || 3.7 || 1.0 || 0.4 || 0.1 || 8.2
|-
| style="text-align:left;"|2009–10
| style="text-align:left;"|Colorado
| 31 || 26 || 21.5 || .453 || .381 || .593 || 3.1 || 0.9 || 0.7 || 0.4 || 5.5
|-
| style="text-align:left;"|2010–11
| style="text-align:left;"|Colorado
| 38 || 38 || 22.2 || .523 || .192 || .629 || 4.2 || 0.7 || 0.6 || 0.6 || 6.6
|-
| style="text-align:left;"|2011–12
| style="text-align:left;"|Colorado
| 36 || 35 || 27.1 || .486 || .359 || .689 || 4.4 || 0.9 || 0.6 || 0.3 || 11.1
|-
|- class="sortbottom"
| colspan="2" style="text-align:center;"|Career
| 136 || 130 || 25.3 || .473 || .308 || .655 || 3.9 || 0.9 || 0.6 || 0.3 || 7.9

Professional career
During his career, Dufault has played in Czech Republic, Macedonia, Finland, France and Hungary.

The Basketball Tournament (TBT) (2016–present) 

In the summers of 2016 and 2017, Dufault played in The Basketball Tournament on ESPN with Team Colorado (Colorado Alumni).  He competed for the $2 million prize, and for Team Colorado in 2017, he averaged 9.7 points per game shooting 54 percent inside the arc.  As a No. 1 seed in the West Region, Dufault helped take Team Colorado to the Super 16 Round, but was defeated by Armored Athlete 84–75.

References

External links
Colorado Buffaloes profile

1990 births
Living people
American expatriate basketball people in Finland
American expatriate basketball people in France
American expatriate basketball people in Hungary
American expatriate basketball people in the Czech Republic
American expatriate basketball people in North Macedonia
American expatriate basketball people in Japan
Basketball players from North Dakota
Colorado Buffaloes men's basketball players
Niigata Albirex BB players
People from Dickinson, North Dakota
Power forwards (basketball)
Soproni KC players
American men's basketball players